Riddells Creek railway station is located on the Deniliquin line in Victoria, Australia. It serves the town of Riddells Creek, and it opened on 8 July 1861. It was renamed Riddell on 9 May 1904, and was renamed Riddells Creek on 12 October 1976.

History

Riddells Creek opened with the line on 8 July 1861. The station, like the township itself, was named after local settler John Riddell, who acquired property in the area in 1841. Riddell later became a member of the Victorian Legislative Council and the Victorian Legislative Assembly.

In 1864, a goods shed and goods platform was provided on the Down platform (Platform 2). By 1879, the station had a signal box and was a block post, using the telegraph instruments, with Winter's instruments provided by 1890.

The station was renamed Riddell on 9 May 1904, as part of a policy by the Victorian Railways to adopt short station names. By this time, there was two sidings to the south of Platform 2.

On 12 October 1976, the station was renamed back to Riddells Creek.

A six lever frame was provided in 1927, to control the signals, until it was closed as a block post in April 1993. After this, the signals and interlocking were abolished, and a crossover at the Up end of the station was spiked.

As part of the Regional Fast Rail project in 2005, the station received a refurbishment, including new platform facings and new fencing. In 2010, the goods shed was refurbished into a waiting room and ticket office. In January 2014, the platforms were extended to accommodate longer trains.

Platforms and services

Riddells Creek has two side platforms. In the morning, trains to Melbourne depart from Platform 2, and trains to Bendigo depart from Platform 1, with this arrangement reversing in the afternoon. This is to allow services in the peak direction of travel to use the single 160 km/h track that was upgraded in 2006, as part of the Regional Fast Rail project.

It is serviced by V/Line Bendigo and Echuca line services.

Platform 1:
 services to Southern Cross, Kyneton, Bendigo, Eaglehawk and Epsom
 services to Echuca and Southern Cross

Platform 2:
 services to Kyneton, Bendigo, Eaglehawk, Epsom and Southern Cross
 services to Echuca and Southern Cross

Transport links

Dysons operates one route via Riddells Creek station, under contract to Public Transport Victoria:
Lancefield – Gisborne

References

External links

Victorian Railway Stations gallery
Melway map at street-directory.com.au

Regional railway stations in Victoria (Australia)
Shire of Macedon Ranges